The World Athletics Relays, known as the IAAF World Relays until 2019, is an international biennial track and field sporting event held by World Athletics where teams from around the world compete in relay races, some of which are not part of the standard Olympic programme. The first three editions were set to take place in Nassau, Bahamas at the Thomas Robinson Stadium in 2014, 2015 and 2017. Originally intended as an annual event, it was later decided to happen every odd year, the same as the World Athletics Championships for which it serves as a qualification stage.

The competition format for the first edition included the 4 × 100 metres relay, the 4 × 200 metres relay, the 4 × 400 metres relay, the 4 × 800 metres relay and the 4 × 1500 metres relay. The first edition had a $1.4 million prize fund.

From the second edition, the 4 × 1500 metres relay was replaced by the distance medley relay. However, this was short-lived and was itself replaced by a mixed-gender 4 × 400 metres relay for the third edition. In 2019 the 2 × 2 × 400 m relay and the shuttle hurdles relay were added to the mixed-gender category.

The 2021 World Athletics Relays were held in Chorzów, Poland at the Silesian Stadium.

Championships

Events

Championships records

Men

Women

Mixed

Medal table
Updated: March 2022

Multiple wins
Multiple wins athletes are.

Three wins

Two wins

References

External links
World Athletics Relays on worldathletics.org
Yokohama 2019 Official Website

Track relay races
Recurring sporting events established in 2014
Relays
Relays
 
Biennial athletics competitions